Burtness is a surname. Notable people with the surname include:

Barbara Burtness, American internist and oncologist
Carl S. Burtness (1882-1954), American farmer, businessman, politician
Harold W. Burtness (1897–1978), American railroad executive
Olger B. Burtness (1884–1960), American politician and judge